The vice-admiralties of the coast were posts established in each of the twenty maritime counties of England, the North and South of Wales, and the four provinces of Ireland. The officer holders, designated as "vice-admirals", were responsible for naval administration in their county, and were deputies of Lord High Admiral.

A vice-admiral's responsibilities included, deciding the lawfulness of prizes captured by privateers, dealing with salvage claims for wrecks, acting as a judge and implementing the role of the Impress Service. The earliest record of an appointment was of William Gonson as Vice-Admiral of Norfolk and Suffolk in 1536.

From around 1560, vice-admirals of the coasts acquired a more public profile than they had enjoyed previously. In the second half of the sixteenth century they increasingly received orders from the privy council. In 1561, apparently for the first time, the Crown addressed instructions directly to the vice-admirals. In 1660 their function came under the remit of the Board of Admiralty.

There are also a few examples of the title Vice-Admiral of the West. It is not however clear whether this was a separate appointment or possibly some incorrect use of an older title being applied to the holders of the Cornwall or Devon post.

List of vice-admiralties

England
Vice-Admiral of Cheshire
Vice-Admiral of Cornwall (including the Isles of Scilly)
Vice-Admiral of Cumberland
Vice-Admiral of Devon
Vice-Admiral of Dorset
Vice-Admiral of Durham
Vice-Admiral of Essex
Vice-Admiral of Gloucester
Vice-Admiral of Hampshire (including the Isle of Wight)
Vice-Admiral of Kent
Vice-Admiral of Lancashire
Vice-Admiral of Lincolnshire
Vice-Admiral of Norfolk
Vice-Admiral of Northumberland
Vice-Admiral of Somerset
Vice-Admiral of Suffolk
Vice-Admiral of Sussex
Vice-Admiral of Westmorland
Vice-Admiral of Yorkshire

Wales
Vice-Admiral of North Wales
Vice-Admiral of South Wales
Vice-Admiral of Carmarthen
Vice-Admiral of Pembroke

Scotland
Vice-Admiral of Scotland
Vice-Admiral of Orkney and Shetland
Vice-Admiral of the Western Coast

Ireland
Vice-Admiral of Ireland
Vice-Admiral of Connaught
Vice-Admiral of Leinster
Vice-Admiral of Munster
Vice-Admiral of Ulster

References

External links
Lists of post holders for each county are to be found as follows:
1558-1660 
1660- mid C19